UAPSat-1 was a satellite situated in the earth orbit created and operated by students and staff at Universidad Alas Peruanas. It was launched on an Orbital Sciences Corporation Antares rocket alongside Cygnus CRS Orb-1. Orbital decay occurred on July 1, 2014.

References

CubeSats
Spacecraft launched by Antares rockets
Spacecraft launched in 2014
Spacecraft which reentered in 2014
Satellites deployed from the International Space Station